Neonesthes capensis, the Cape snaggletooth, is a lightfish of the family Stomiidae, found in all tropical and subtropical oceans except the north Pacific, at depths of between 70 and 1,500 meters.  Its length is between 10 and 17 centimeters.

The anal fin is narrow but long, reaching almost to the caudal fin.

References

 
 Tony Ayling & Geoffrey Cox, Collins Guide to the Sea Fishes of New Zealand,  (William Collins Publishers Ltd, Auckland, New Zealand 1982) 

Stomiidae
Fish described in 1924